Anse des Mûriers is a quartier of Terre-de-Bas Island, located in Îles des Saintes archipelago in the Caribbean. It is located in the eastern part of the island. The main port of the island is located at this place.

Sights
The artillery battery ruins of Fer à Cheval (literally: horseshoe) cove.

References

Populated places in Îles des Saintes
Quartiers of Îles des Saintes